George Adolphus Schott (also referenced as George Augustus Schott) FRS (25 January 1868 – 15 July 1937) was a British mathematician. He is best known for developing the full theory of radiation from electrons travelling at close to the speed of light.

Born in Bradford to German parents, he was educated at Bradford Grammar School and later studied at Trinity College, Cambridge, receiving his Bachelor of Arts in 1890. After obtaining his Doctor of Science he became assistant lecturer to D.M. Lewis in the Department of Physics. After a years leave, in which he travelled to Germany, he became lecturer of Applied Mathematics at Aberystwyth University, where he would spend the rest of his career. In 1910 he became Chair of the Applied Mathematics department and finally vice-president of the college.

During Schott's early years at Aberystwyth he published his classical work on electromagnetic radiation, which follows the work laid down by Alfred-Marie Liénard. It was not until 1947 that the blue light observed near synchrotron particle accelerators, called 'synchrotron radiation', was recognised as the radiation Schott predicted. In 1909 he was awarded the Adams Prize and in 1922 became a Fellow of the Royal Society.

Schott remained one of the last respectable 'anti-quantum' scientists, opposing the quantum formalism introduced by Niels Bohr. In 1933 he published the nonradiation condition of a wobbling charged sphere.

Published works of note
On the Reflexion and Refraction of Light (1894)
Electromagnetic radiation: And the mechanical reactions arising from it (1912)

References

1868 births
1937 deaths
English mathematicians
English physicists
Fellows of the Royal Society
Scientists from Bradford
Alumni of Trinity College, Cambridge